Sunfish Township is one of the fourteen townships of Pike County, Ohio, United States.  The 2000 census found 1,317 people in the township.

Geography
Located in the southwestern part of the county, it borders the following townships:
Benton Township - north
Pebble Township - northeast
Newton Township - east
Camp Creek Township - southeast
Rarden Township, Scioto County - south
Franklin Township, Adams County - west
Mifflin Township - northwest

No municipalities are located in Sunfish Township. Elm Grove has been a populated place within the township since before 1812.

Name and history
It is the only Sunfish Township statewide.

Government
The township is governed by a three-member board of trustees, who are elected in November of odd-numbered years to a four-year term beginning on the following January 1. Two are elected in the year after the presidential election and one is elected in the year before it. There is also an elected township fiscal officer, who serves a four-year term beginning on April 1 of the year after the election, which is held in November of the year before the presidential election. Vacancies in the fiscal officership or on the board of trustees are filled by the remaining trustees.

References

External links
Pike County visitors bureau website

Townships in Pike County, Ohio
Townships in Ohio